The 2000 Nordic Tournament was the fourth edition and took place in Lahti, Falun and Oslo between 4–12 March 2000.

Results

Overall

References

External links
Official website 

2000 in ski jumping
Nordic Tournament